ACWA may refer to:

Program Executive Office, Assembled Chemical Weapons Alternatives, department of the US army responsible for chemical weapons decommissioning
Amalgamated Clothing Workers of America, US labor union
Advisory Committee on Works of Art, committee of the UK houses of Parliament
Alberta Co-operative Wholesale Association, a Canadian Cooperative enterprise
Association of California Water Agencies, coalition of public water agencies supplying water in California
Adventist College of West Africa, predecessor of Babcock University, a religiously founded Nigerian university
ACWa, environmental company acquired by Consolidated Contractors Company
American Civil War Association of Northern and Central California, American Civil War reenactment group
ACWA Power, the energy division of the Saudi Arabian Al-Muhaidib group of companies
ACWA Services Ltd., UK based water treatment company
ACWA, Academy of Combative Warrior Arts, Self Defense System